The Draghi government was the 67th government of the Italian Republic, led by former President of the European Central Bank, Mario Draghi. It was in office between 13 February 2021 and 22 October 2022.

The Draghi government was formed following the resignation of Prime Minister Giuseppe Conte in the midst of a political crisis which led to the Conte government losing its majority. After consultations with political parties, President Sergio Mattarella tasked Draghi with forming a "high-profile" government. Mattarella stated that the new government would have to face the health, economic and social crises related to the COVID-19 pandemic, as well as overseeing the EU relief fund associated with it. The Draghi government was described as a national unity government by numerous news sources. The choice by Mattarella to appoint Draghi as Prime Minister was welcomed by some international observers, with others casting doubt on the stability of a new technocratic government.

The Draghi Government was formed with both politicians and independent technocrats, and is supported by a large majority of the Italian Parliament, including the anti-establishment Five Star Movement (M5S), the right-wing League (Lega), the centre-right Forza Italia (FI), the centre-left Democratic Party (PD), the centrist Italia Viva (IV), and the leftist Article One (Art.1).

On 21 July 2022, following M5S, Lega and FI's withdrawal of their support to the government, Prime Minister Draghi handed his resignation. The government continued to operate as a caretaker government until the next government formation following the 2022 Italian general election on 25 September.

Supporting parties

Beginning of term
At the time of the government formation, its ministers were part of the following parties.

End of term
Since 1 August 2022 the government is composed of the following parties.

On 21 June 2022, Luigi Di Maio led a breakaway group outside of the M5S and formed Together for the Future, which confirmed its support for the government. Mariastella Gelmini, Renato Brunetta and Mara Carfagna left FI on 21, 22 and 26 July, respectively. On 29 July, Gelmini and Carfagna joined Action. On 30 July, Federico D'Incà left the M5S, and on 1 August he founded Environment 2050 alongside deputy Davide Crippa.

History

Background 

On 13 January 2021, Italia Viva (IV) withdrew its support for the second Conte government, triggering a political crisis. Conte subsequently won confidence motions in both houses of Parliament, with the abstention of IV, but could only reach a plurality in the Senate, rather than an absolute majority. In the wake of this, Conte tendered his resignation to President Mattarella, who then began a round of discussions with various parties to form a new government.

Government formation 

Mattarella met with delegations of political parties on 28 and 29 January to determine their views on the formation of a new government. The Five Star Movement (M5S), Democratic Party (PD), Free and Equal (LeU), For the Autonomies, Europeanists, and some members of the Mixed Group all expressed support for the reappointment of Conte as Prime Minister, but IV ruled this out. The centre-right and right-wing parties, the League (Lega), Forza Italia (FI) and the Brothers of Italy (FdI), stated that they preferred a snap election, but would be willing to join a national unity government under certain conditions. Following this deadlock, Mattarella asked Roberto Fico, the President of the Chamber of Deputies, to explore the possibility of a grand coalition government. On 2 February, Fico confirmed that there was insufficient support for the proposal.

With the prospect of early elections looming, on 3 February Mattarella invited former ECB President Mario Draghi to the Quirinal Palace to charge him to forming a national unity government. Draghi accepted the offer, and began consultations with the leaders of political parties. Conte publicly endorsed him as his successor the following day, and further negotiations commenced. On 10 February, League leader Matteo Salvini and FI leader Silvio Berlusconi jointly announced their support for Draghi. Conversely, FdI leader Giorgia Meloni stated that her party would go into opposition. The PD's national board unanimously voted on 11 February to support Draghi. The same day, the M5S held an online referendum on whether to "support a technical-political government with the other political forces indicated by the appointed prime minister Mario Draghi", which was approved by 59.3%.

Having achieved sufficient support, on 12 February Draghi met with President Mattarella at the Quirinal Palace and presented his list of ministers. The Draghi government was sworn in on the following day, 13 February, at 11:00 AM UTC. The government was composed of twenty-four ministers, eight women and sixteen men, most of them from Northern Italy, largely from Lombardy and Veneto; it contained representatives from all supportive political parties, as well as numerous independent technocrats.

Investiture vote
On 17 February 2021, the Senate approved the Draghi government with 262 votes in favour, 40 against and 2 abstentions. The following day, the Chamber of Deputies affirmed its support, with 535 votes in favour, 56 against and 5 abstentions. This was the third largest majority garnered by a government in the history of the Italian Republic after the Monti government and after the fourth Andreotti government.

Government crisis and collapse

In July 2022, the M5S did not participate to a confidence vote in the Senate on a government bill, the so-called decreto aiuti, regarding a €27 billion economic aid to counteract the energy and economy crisis. Prime Minister Draghi offered his resignation, which was rejected by President Mattarella. After a few days, on 20 July, Draghi spoke to the Senate again, seeking a confidence vote again to secure the government majority supporting his cabinet, while rejecting the proposal put forward by Lega and FI on a new government without the M5S. In that occasion, the M5S, Lega and FI, three major parties which were supporting the Draghi government, withdrew their support. Consequently, Draghi tendered his final resignation to President Mattarella, who dissolved the houses of Parliament, leading to an early election in September 2022, and
asked Draghi to stay in office to handle current affairs (as is customary in Italian politics) until a new government could be formed following the upcoming general election.

Party breakdown

Beginning of term

Ministers

Ministers and other members 
 Independents: Prime minister, 8 ministers, 3 undersecretaries
 Five Star Movement (M5S): 4 ministers, 2 deputy ministers, 9 undersecretaries 
 League (Lega): 3 ministers, 1 deputy minister, 8 undersecretaries
 Democratic Party (PD): 3 ministers, 1 deputy minister, 5 undersecretaries
 Forza Italia (FI): 3 ministers, 1 deputy minister, 5 undersecretaries
 Italia Viva (IV): 1 minister, 1 deputy minister, 1 undersecretary
 Article One (Art.1): 1 minister, 1 undersecretary
 Democratic Centre (CD): 1 undersecretary
 Us with Italy (NcI): 1 undersecretary
 More Europe (+E): 1 undersecretary

End of term

Ministers

Ministers and other members 
 Independents: Prime minister, 9 ministers, 2 undersecretaries
 League (Lega): 3 ministers, 1 deputy minister, 8 undersecretaries
 Democratic Party (PD): 3 ministers, 1 deputy minister, 5 undersecretaries
 Five Star Movement (M5S): 2 ministers, 1 deputy minister, 5 undersecretaries 
 Action (A): 2 ministers
 Together for the Future (IpF): 1 minister, 1 deputy minister, 4 undersecretaries
 Italia Viva (IV): 1 minister, 1 deputy minister, 1 undersecretary
 Article One (Art.1): 1 minister, 1 undersecretary
 Environment 2050 (A2050): 1 minister 
 Forza Italia (FI): 1 deputy minister, 6 undersecretaries
 Democratic Centre (CD): 1 undersecretary
 Us with Italy (NcI): 1 undersecretary
 More Europe (+E): 1 undersecretary

Geographical breakdown 

Northern Italy: 18 ministers
Lombardy: 9 ministers
Veneto: 4 ministers
Emilia-Romagna: 2 ministers
Friuli-Venezia Giulia: 1 minister
Liguria: 1 minister
Piedmont: 1 minister
Central Italy: 2 ministers (including Draghi)
Lazio: 2 ministers (including Draghi)
Southern and Insular Italy: 4 ministers
Basilicata: 2 ministers
Campania: 2 ministers

Council of Ministers 
The Council of Ministers is composed of the following members:

Composition

References

 
2021 establishments in Italy
Italian governments
Cabinets established in 2021
Cabinet
Cabinets disestablished in 2022